Annisa Saufika (born 21 June 1993) is an Indonesian badminton player who specializes in doubles. She is from PB Djarum, a badminton club in Kudus, Central Java, which she joined in 2010. Teamed-up with Alfian Eko Prasetya, she won the 2014 Vietnam International Challenge and New Zealand Open Grand Prix tournament in the mixed doubles event.

Achievements

BWF World Tour (1 runner-up) 
The BWF World Tour, which was announced on 19 March 2017 and implemented in 2018, is a series of elite badminton tournaments sanctioned by the Badminton World Federation (BWF). The BWF World Tours are divided into levels of World Tour Finals, Super 1000, Super 750, Super 500, Super 300 (part of the HSBC World Tour), and the BWF Tour Super 100.

Mixed doubles

BWF Grand Prix (2 titles, 3 runners-up) 
The BWF Grand Prix had two levels, the Grand Prix and Grand Prix Gold. It was a series of badminton tournaments sanctioned by the Badminton World Federation (BWF) and played between 2007 and 2017.

Mixed doubles

  BWF Grand Prix Gold tournament
  BWF Grand Prix tournament

BWF International Challenge/Series (2 titles, 1 runner-up) 
Mixed doubles

  BWF International Challenge tournament
  BWF International Series tournament

Performance timeline

National team 
 Senior level

Individual competitions 
 Senior level

Record against selected opponents 
Mixed doubles results with Alfian Eko Prasetya against World Superseries finalists, World Championship semi-finalists, and Olympic quarter-finalists:

  Xu Chen & Ma Jin 0–2
  Michael Fuchs & Birgit Michels 1–0
  Riky Widianto & Richi Puspita Dili 0–1

References

External links 
 
 

1993 births
Living people
People from Cirebon
Sportspeople from West Java
Indonesian female badminton players